15 South Second Street is a historic home located in Newport, Pennsylvania.  It served as home to many Newsstands as well as a grocer and clothier over the years.

This is a two-story home with a hipped roof, resting on a stone foundation. Its original clapboards are now clad in aluminum siding. The home has two bay windows, with a storefront on first story.  It has a pair of double windows on the 2nd floor along with hipped-roof dormers with triple panes in the upper sashes.

History 
This was home to the William Witmer Newsstand, Jess Thomas Newsstand, Russel Zeiders Newsstand, Charles Fleck Grocer, Joseph Frish Clothing and Watches as well as the Margaret Bell Millinery.

It was designated a contributing property to the  Newport Historic District in 1999.
It is also identified as #70 in the

References 

Geography of Perry County, Pennsylvania
Second Empire architecture in Pennsylvania
Italianate architecture in Pennsylvania
Working-class culture in Pennsylvania
National Register of Historic Places in Perry County, Pennsylvania
Historic district contributing properties in Pennsylvania